Chernoye is a civilian airfield located near to Fedurnovo, Balashikha, Moscow Oblast, Russia.

It is home to the Moscow Aviation-Repair Plant DOSAAF which perform aviation maintenance on Mil Mi-2, Mil Mi-8 and Antonov An-2 aircraft.

References

Soviet Air Force bases
Russian Air Force bases
Airports in Moscow Oblast